VR Baseball 99 is a video game developed by VR Sports and published by Interplay for PlayStation in 1998.

An enhanced version of the game for Microsoft Windows, VR Baseball 2000, was released in October 1998.

Reception

The game received above-average reviews according to the review aggregation website GameRankings. Next Generation said, "It may not be as complex as MLB '99, but VR Baseball will provide several hours of simple, clean, baseball pleasure."

Notes

References

External links
 

1998 video games
Baseball video games
Interplay Entertainment games
PlayStation (console) games
PlayStation (console)-only games
Video games developed in the United States
Video games set in 1999